MTV Party To Go Remixed was the fifteenth and final album in the MTV Party To Go series.

Track listing
Daylight (Tony Moran Remix) - New Life Crisis
Show Me the Meaning of Being Lonely (Soul Solution Remix) - Backstreet Boys
Get It On Tonite (Jonathan Peters Club Mix) - Montell Jordan
Back at One (Groove Brothers Club Mix) - Brian McKnight
There You Go (Hani Num Club) - Pink
Party Up (Up in Here) (Jonathan Peters Club Mix) - DMX
Papa's Got a Brand New Pigbag (Thunderpuss Club Mix) - Thunderpuss
It Feels So Good (Sonique's Breakbeat Mix) - Sonique
The Bad Touch (Eiffel 65 Remix) - Bloodhound Gang
Shackles (Praise You) (Victor Calderone Big Room Mix) - Mary Mary
Love One Another (Rosabel Anthem Mix) - Amber
By Your Side (Original Mix) - Malina
All Good? (Ugo & Sanz Chaka's Affair Remix) - De La Soul featuring Chaka Khan
(I Wonder Why) He's the Greatest DJ (Masters At Work Vocal Mix) - Tony Touch featuring Keisha & Pam of Total
I Wanna Know (Pound Boys Remix) - Joe

Mtv Party To Go 15
1999 compilation albums
1999 remix albums
Tommy Boy Records compilation albums
Dance-pop compilation albums
Pop compilation albums
Pop remix albums
Dance music remix albums
Tommy Boy Records remix albums